Straße zur Heimat is a 1952 German film.

Cast

External links
 

1952 films
1950s German-language films
Italian romance films
1950s romance films
German black-and-white films
1950s German films